Emmanuel TV is a Christian television network with headquarters in Lagos, Nigeria. It was founded by T.B. Joshua, former senior pastor of the Synagogue, Church of All Nations (SCOAN), in Lagos, Nigeria.  It is also the most subscribed Christian ministry channel on YouTube worldwide with well over 1,000,000 subscribers, as of January 2019.

History
In the late 1990s, SCOAN began gaining international attention due to the distribution of video cassettes, showing clips of Joshua's early ministry and alleged miracles.  Additionally, Joshua began airing regular programs purporting to show 'miracles' on local Nigerian television. However, when Nigeria's National Broadcasting Commission (NBC), under the instruction of then President Olusegun Obasanjo controversially banned the showing of 'miracles', in 2004, most of his programs were taken off air. This eventually paved the way for the emergence of Emmanuel TV on 8 March 2006 by T.B. Joshua.

Since its inception, Emmanuel TV has broadcast Christian programmes, stating that its mission is 'to preach the Good News to all mankind.' From humble beginnings, it has rapidly grown to become one of Africa's most well known brands and popular television stations. In its profile on Joshua, the BBC described him as "Nigeria's best known televangelist".

Programming
Emmanuel TV broadcasts a range of programmes from Synagogue, Church of All Nations (SCOAN). It has gained a reputation for being a Christian station that does not run any on-air campaigns for financial assistance and among the only Christian stations that does not syndicate programs of other pastors.

Emmanuel TV DStv Channel
Emmanuel TV is also found on DStv Channel 390 where biblical readings, testimonies, teaching and Christian kids programmes like cartoons which are mainly about the Bible and Jesus Christ are found.

Reach
Emmanuel TV is broadcast worldwide on various satellites. Its programmes air weekly on a number of local television stations across Africa, debuting on DStv and GOtv in November 2015, as well as Startimes in February 2016. Its playout centre is located in Johannesburg, South Africa.

Emmanuel TV's motto is 'Changing Lives, Changing Nations, Changing the World.' The station is also known for its catch-phrase, 'Distance Is Not A Barrier', encouraging viewers to 'pray along' with T.B. Joshua by 'touching the screen'. There are several claims of people receiving miraculous 'healing' through these prayers, including popular Nollywood actress Tonto Dikeh who said Joshua's prayers ended her 14-year smoking addiction.

T.B. Joshua has donated televisions to prisons and hospitals so that they will be able to watch the Emmanuel TV broadcasts.

YouTube channel
Emmanuel TV's YouTube channel is the most subscribed Christian ministry YouTube channel worldwide and the third most subscribed in Nigeria. Google ranked one of Emmanuel TV's YouTube videos as the fourth most viewed clip ever within Nigeria. YouTube has shut down the channel, which claimed over 1.8 million subscribers and 600 million viewers, on April 13, 2021. YouTube says that it "prohibits content which alleges that someone is mentally ill, diseased, or inferior because of their membership in a protected group including sexual orientation."

References

External links
 Official website of the SCOAN
 Official website of Emmanuel TV

Christian mass media companies
Evangelical television networks
Television channels and stations established in 2006
Religious television stations in Nigeria
Television stations in Lagos
International broadcasters